The 2020 Ohio Valley Conference men's basketball tournament was the final event of the 2019–20 NCAA Division I men's basketball season in the Ohio Valley Conference. The tournament was held March 4 through March 7, 2020 at the Ford Center in Evansville, Indiana.

Belmont defeated Murray State in the championship game of the tournament to receive the conference's automatic bid to the NCAA tournament.

Seeds
Only the top eight teams in the conference qualified for the tournament. Teams were seeded by record within the conference, with a tiebreaker system to seed teams with identical conference records. The No. 1 and No. 2 seeds receive double byes to the semifinals. The No. 3 and No. 4 seeds receive a single bye to the quarterfinals.

Schedule

Bracket

* denotes number of overtime periods

Source

References

Tournament
Ohio Valley Conference men's basketball tournament
College basketball tournaments in Indiana
Basketball competitions in Evansville, Indiana
Ohio Valley Conference men's basketball tournament
Ohio Valley Conference men's basketball tournament